College of Engineering Hanyang University (한양대학교 공과대학) is the oldest engineering school in South Korea which is established in 1939. It is the major college(number of students, professors, etc.) of Hanyang University.

Organization

Undergraduate

College of Engineering in Hanyang University is divided into 4 distinct colleges by its field, and all these colleges are administratively-independent.

College of Engineering I
Field : Architecture / Urban / Environment
Department of Architecture
Department of Architectural Engineering
Department of Civil and Environmental Engineering
Department of Urban Planning and Engineering
Department of Geoenvironmental System Engineering

College of Engineering II
Field : IT / Electronics
Department of Computer Science & Engineering
Department of Information Systems
Department of Electronics and Communications Engineering
Department of Fusion Electronics
Department of Energy Engineering
Department of Electrical and Biomedical Engineering

College of Engineering III
Field : Materials / Chemicals / Energy
Department of Materials Science and Engineering
Department of Applied Chemical Engineering
Department of Energy

College of Engineering IV
Fields: Mechanics / Industrial Engineering / Nuclear Engineering
Department of Mechanical Engineering
Department of Nuclear Engineering
Department of Industrial Engineering

Education
College of Engineering, Hanyang University has its own education program than generals of Hanyang University. For example, : ABEEK (Certification of Engineering Education) and Project for graduation. The education policy down below is for only in college of engineering. It also has another education program according to general program of Hanyang University, like exchange student program with MIT

ABEEK
ABEEK is Certification of Engineering Education in Korea. Students in College of Engineering can take this course for option. Some companies, like Samsung, asks applicants whether they took ABEEK course.

Joint degree Program 
College of Engineering and College of Engineering Science have joint degree(Bachelor) program with Illinois Institute of Technology and Temple University.
They send about 35 ~ 60 students to IIT

Project for graduation
Most of Departments in College of Engineering has certification program for graduation like "Capstone Design", "Engineering Project". Students who take this program designs their own portfolio and it will be estimated by professors.
Some students said this program as "Graduation Project"(The official name of this program is not unified). Students must pass this program or postpone their graduation until passing it.

Performance
Hanyang University College of engineering affects a lot in South Korea society. It was the oldest engineering college in South Korea. And it has been called as an "Engineer Academy". Also there are many alumni in Korea society. Chung Ju-yung, formal president of Hyundai Group, said about Hanyang University College of Engineering on official speech. It publishes the SCI journal named Journal of Ceramic Processing Research

See also
Hanyang University
College of Engineering
Hanyang University Station
Illinois Institute of Technology

References

External links
College of Engineering, Hanyang University
College of Engineering, Hanyang University(Korean)

Engineering universities and colleges in South Korea
Hanyang University
1939 establishments in Korea
Educational institutions established in 1939